Petrokovo is a rural locality (a village) in Borisoglebskoye Rural Settlement, Muromsky District, Vladimir Oblast, Russia.

Demographics 
The population was 259 as of 2010. There are 5 streets.

Geography 
Petrokovo is located 16 km northwest of Murom (the district's administrative centre) by road. Lesnikovo is the nearest rural locality.

References 

Rural localities in Muromsky District
Muromsky Uyezd